Alexander or Alex Bruce may refer to:

Alexander Bruce, Earl of Carrick (died 1333), illegitimate son of Edward Bruce, younger brother of Robert the Bruce
Alexander Bruce, 2nd Earl of Kincardine (1629–1681), Scottish inventor, politician, judge and freemason
Alexander Romanovich Bruce (1704–1760), Imperial Russian Army general
Alexander Bruce (stock inspector) (1827–1903), Australian stock inspector and farmer
Alexander Balmain Bruce (1831–1899), Scottish churchman and theologian
Alexander Campbell Bruce (1835–1927), American architect 
Alexander Bruce (politician) (1839–1917), New Zealand engineer, trade unionist and politician
Alexander Low Bruce (1839–1893), founder of A. L. Bruce Estates
Alexander Bruce (neurologist) (1846–1911), Scottish surgeon and psychiatrist
Alexander Bruce, 6th Lord Balfour of Burleigh (1849–1921), Secretary for Scotland
Sir Alexander Carmichael Bruce (1850–1926), Assistant Commissioner of the Metropolitan Police
Alexander B. Bruce (1853–1909), Scottish American baker and politician
Alexander Livingstone Bruce (1881–1954), businessman in colonial Nyasaland
Alex Bruce (rugby union) (John Alexander Bruce, 1887–1970), New Zealand rugby union player and cricketer
Alex Bruce (footballer, born 1952) (Alexander Robert Bruce), Scottish footballer 
Alex Bruce (footballer, born 1984) (Alex Stephen Bruce), English and Northern Irish footballer 
Alex Bruce (footballer, born 1998), English footballer, currently playing in the United States
Alexander "Demruth" Bruce, creator of the video game Antichamber

See also
Alexander de Brus (1285–1307), brother of Robert I of Scotland
Alexander Bryce (disambiguation)
Alexandra Bruce (born 1990), Canadian badminton player, known as Alex